AIM motorcycles were sports machines built in Italy between 1974 and 1982 using 49cc and 124cc Sachs and Franco Morini two-stroke engines.

See also 

List of Italian companies
List of motorcycle manufacturers

References

External links
1979 50cc model
80cc Enduro model

Defunct motor vehicle manufacturers of Italy
Defunct motorcycle manufacturers of Italy